"Take It from Me" is a song co-written and recorded by American country pop singer Jordan Davis. It was released in May 2018 as the second single from Davis's debut album Home State (2018). Davis wrote the song with his brother Jacob and Jason Gantt, the former saying he suggested that it be about advice-seeking and Jordan gave it a more literally approach, being about the early stages of a relationship. "Take It from Me" peaked at number two and four on both the Billboard Country Airplay and Hot Country Songs charts respectively. It also reached number 46 on the Hot 100 chart. It was certified Platinum by the Recording Industry Association of America (RIAA), and has sold 77,000 copies in the United States as of April 2019. The song achieved similar chart success in Canada, reaching number four on the Canada Country chart and number 67 on the Canadian Hot 100. It was also certified Platinum by Music Canada, denoting sales of over 80,000 units in that country. An accompanying music video for the song, directed by Eric Ryan Anderson, follows a couple's adventures through New York City.

Content and history
Jordan Davis wrote the song with his brother, Jacob Davis, and Jason Gantt. Of the songwriting process, Jordan Davis said that his brother provided the idea of an "advice-seeking song", which he then chose to write "a little bit more literally". He also told Billboard that "is a song about the early stages of a relationship when it doesn't matter what she wants from you, she can take it -- your time, your shirts, anything -- she can have it. I think everybody has gone through that honeymoon phase of a relationship".

Commercial performance
The song reached number two on Billboards Country Airplay chart dated March 9, 2019, having been blocked from number one by Luke Combs's "Beautiful Crazy". On the Billboard Hot 100, it debuted at number 75 the week of January 12, 2019. Eight weeks later, it peaked at number 46 and stayed on the chart for thirteen weeks. It has sold 77,000 copies in the United States as of April 2019. It was certified platinum by the Recording Industry Association of America (RIAA) on August 16, 2019.

In Canada, the track debuted at number 97 on the Canadian Hot 100 the week of February 2, 2019. Seven weeks later, it peaked at number 67 and remained on the chart for ten weeks. It was certified platinum by Music Canada on September 13, 2019, denoting sales of over 80,000 units in that country.

Music video
The song's video was directed by Eric Ryan Anderson. It was shot in New York City and follows a couple's adventures through the city. Davis premiered the video on Billboards website in July 2018.

Track listing

Charts

Weekly charts

Year-end charts

Certifications

References

2018 singles
2018 songs
Jordan Davis (singer) songs
Songs written by Jordan Davis (singer)
MCA Nashville Records singles